The International League Top MLB Prospect Award is an annual award given to the best rookie player in Minor League Baseball's International League based on their regular-season performance as voted on by league managers. Broadcasters, Minor League Baseball executives, members of the media, coaches, and other representatives from the league's clubs have previously voted as well. Though the circuit was founded in 1884, it did not become known as the International League on a consistent basis until 1912. The first Rookie of the Year Award, as it was originally known, was not issued until 1950. After the cancellation of the 2020 season, the league was known as the Triple-A East in 2021 before reverting to the International League name in 2022. The Top MLB Prospect Award began to be issued instead of the Rookie of the Year Award in 2021.

Twenty-six outfielders have won the award, the most of any position. First basemen, with 13 winners, have won the most among infielders, followed by third basemen (9), shortstops (8), and second basemen (4). Nine pitchers and three catchers have won the award.

Seventeen players who have won the Top MLB Prospect Award also won the International League Most Valuable Player Award (MVP) in the same season: Don Buford (1963), Joe Foy (1965), Mike Epstein (1966), Merv Rettenmund (1968), Luis Alvarado (1969), Roger Freed (1970), Jim Rice (1974), Mike Vail (1975), Rich Dauer (1976), Scott Bradley (1984), Dan Pasqua (1985), Randy Milligan (1987), J. T. Snow (1992), Chris Colabello (2013), Steven Souza Jr. (2014), Rhys Hoskins (2017), and Joey Meneses (2018). The only player to win the Top MLB Prospect Award and then later win the MVP Award is Ben Gamel, who was the 2015 Rookie of the Year and 2016 MVP. Of the nine pitchers who have won Top MLB Prospect, five also won the league's Pitcher of the Year Award (formerly the Most Valuable Pitcher Award) in the same season: Bob Trice (1953), Jason Isringhausen (1995), Brian Rose (1997), Brandon Duckworth (2001), and Julio Teherán (2011).

Seventeen players from the Rochester Red Wings have been selected for the Top MLB Prospect Award, more than any other team in the league, followed by the Syracuse Mets (7); the Columbus Clippers (6); the Norfolk Tides and Richmond Braves (5); the Scranton/Wilkes-Barre RailRiders (4); the Charlotte Knights, Gwinnett Stripers, and Pawtucket Red Sox (3); the original Buffalo Bisons, Durham Bulls, Lehigh Valley IronPigs, Louisville Bats, and Montreal Royals (2); and the Columbus Jets, Havana Sugar Kings, Indianapolis Indians, Louisville Colonels, Omaha Storm Chasers, Ottawa Athletics, Richmond Virginians, Springfield Cubs, and Toronto Maple Leafs (International League) (1).

Eleven players from the Baltimore Orioles Major League Baseball (MLB) organization have won the award, more than any other, followed by the New York Yankees organization (10); the Atlanta Braves organization (8); the Philadelphia Phillies organization (6); the Boston Red Sox organization (5); the Minnesota Twins and New York Mets organizations (4); the Chicago White Sox, Cincinnati Reds, and St. Louis Cardinals organizations (3); the Los Angeles Dodgers, Oakland Athletics, Tampa Bay Rays, and Toronto Blue Jays organizations (2); and the Chicago Cubs, Cleveland Guardians, Detroit Tigers, Kansas City Royals, Miami Marlins, Pittsburgh Pirates, and Washington Nationals organizations (1).

Winners

Wins by team

Active International League teams appear in bold.

Wins by organization

Active International League–Major League Baseball affiliations appear in bold.

References
Specific

General

Awards established in 1950
Rookie of the Year Award
Minor league baseball trophies and awards
Rookie player awards